The Griffith State Bank (sometimes referred to as Sam Woods-Griffith Public Library) is a historic building in Griffith, Indiana built in 1920. The bank closed in 1933 and in 1940 the building became a public library, which closed in 1967. It is listed on the National Register of Historic Places (100004050).

See also
 National Register of Historic Places listings in Indiana
 National Register of Historic Places listings in Lake County, Indiana

References

External links
 Griffith State Bank

Bank buildings on the National Register of Historic Places in Indiana
Buildings and structures in Lake County, Indiana
National Register of Historic Places in Lake County, Indiana
Buildings and structures completed in 1920